Gilmorton is a village and civil parish about  northeast of Lutterworth in Leicestershire, England. The 2011 Census recorded the parish population as 976.

Manor
The Domesday Book of 1086 records the village, when its population was about 140. The toponym may be derived from Old English: gilden (or gylden) meaning "golden", and morton, "town on the moor".

In 1303 Roger de Martivall was permitted to alienate land and property at Noseley, Gilmorton and Stretton to create an income for four chaplains at a chantry chapel at Noseley.

Parish church
The Church of England parish church of All Saints has a 14th- and 15th-century tower but it and its spire were rebuilt in 1909. The nave, aisles and chancel were rebuilt in 1860–61 and the south porch was built in 1897. Burlison and Grylls made the stained glass for the east window of the chancel in 1878. Shrigley and Hunt made the stained glass for the Lady Chapel in 1896. Kempe and Kempe made all the other stained glass for the church between 1884 and 1906. All Saints' is a Grade II* listed building.

The west tower has a ring of eight bells. Thomas I Eayre  of Kettering cast the sixth bell in 1738 and the tenor in 1749. Joseph Eayre of St Neots, Huntingdonshire, cast the fourth bell in 1766. John Taylor & Co of Loughborough cast the seventh bell in 1861, the fifth bell in 1871 and the treble, second and third bells in 1909 when the tower was rebuilt.

Economic and social history

The House of Lords debated the inclosure act for Gilmorton in 1777.

A tower mill at Gilmorton was built early in the 19th century. The brick tower survives and has been restored, but neither the cap nor any machinery survives.

In 1942 RAF Bruntingthorpe was opened just east of the parish. The air station was decommissioned in 1962, sold for civilian use in 1965 and is now Bruntingthorpe Aerodrome.

The M1 motorway extension from Crick, Northamptonshire, north to Leeds was built parallel with the Great Central Main Line and just east of it, starting in 1965 and opening in 1968. In 1963 The Reshaping of British Railways report recommended that British Railways close the railway, which it did in 1969.

Amenities
Gilmorton has three pubs: the Crown Inn, the Grey Goose and Mortons, a Village Hall, and a combined Village Store, Post Office and Tea Room.

Gilmorton Chandler Church of England primary school serves Gilmorton and six neighbouring parishes.

References

Sources and further reading

External links

Gilmorton Parish Council

Villages in Leicestershire
Civil parishes in Harborough District